Robert Neil Harrison (born 5 June 1959) is a male English former middle-distance runner.

Athletics career
Harrison is best known for winning the gold medal in the 800 metres at the 1985 European Indoor Championships. He represented England in the 1500 metres event, at the 1986 Commonwealth Games in Edinburgh, Scotland.

International competitions

Personal bests
Outdoor
800 metres – 1:45.31 (Oslo 1984)
1000 metres – 2:17.20 (London 1984)
1500 metres – 3:35.74 (Cwmbran 1986)
One mile – 3:53.85 (Nice 1986)
Indoor
800 metres – 1:47.72 (Pireaus 1985)
1500 metres – 3:42.95 (Cosford 1985)
One mile – 3:59.35 (Cosford 1985)

References

All-Athletics profile

1959 births
Living people
English male middle-distance runners
Athletes (track and field) at the 1986 Commonwealth Games
Universiade medalists in athletics (track and field)
Universiade silver medalists for Great Britain
Commonwealth Games competitors for England